Pierre de l'Argentière (fl. 1330s) was a Medieval French doctor and medical writer. He was master surgeon at Montpellier between 1333 and 1348.

References

French surgeons
Year of birth missing
Year of death missing